Jennifer Kendal (28 February 1934 – 7 September 1984) was an English actress and the founder of the Prithvi Theatre. She was nominated for the BAFTA Award for Best Actress in a Leading Role for the film 36 Chowringhee Lane (1981). Her other film appearances included Bombay Talkie (1970), Junoon (1978), Heat and Dust (1983), and Ghare Baire (1984).

Childhood
Jennifer Kendal was born in Southport, England, but spent much of her youth in India. She and younger sister Felicity Kendal were born to Geoffrey Kendal and Laura Liddell, who ran a travelling theatre company, "Shakespeareana", which travelled around India as depicted in the book and film, Shakespeare Wallah (1965) in which Kendal appeared, uncredited, and which starred her husband Shashi Kapoor, her parents and her sister.

Shashi Kapoor
Shashi Kapoor and Kendal met for the first time in Calcutta, in 1956, where he was part of the Prithvi Theatre company, while she was playing Miranda in the play The Tempest, as part of Shakespeareana. Soon, Shashi Kapoor also began to tour with the Shakespeareana Company, and the couple married in July 1958. Kendal and her husband were also instrumental in the rejuvenation of Prithvi Theatre in Mumbai, with the opening of their theatre in the Juhu area of the city in 1978. Kendal and Kapoor also starred in a number of films together, particularly those produced by Merchant Ivory Productions. Their first joint starring roles were in Bombay Talkie (1970), which was also one of the earlier films produced by Merchant Ivory.

Personal life
The Kapoors had three children: sons Kunal Kapoor and Karan Kapoor, and daughter Sanjana Kapoor; all are former Bollywood actors.

She was diagnosed with terminal colon cancer in 1982 and died of the disease in 1984.

Filmography
 Shakespeare Wallah (1965) – Mrs Bowen (uncredited)
 Bombay Talkie (1970) – Lucia Lane
 Junoon (1978) – Miriam Labadoor (Ruth's Mother)
 36 Chowringhee Lane (1981) Miss Violet Stoneham
 Heat and Dust (1983) – Mrs Saunders
 The Far Pavilions (1984) – Mrs Viccary
 Ghare-Baire (1984) – Miss Gilby (The Home and the World)

Costume Design
Mukti (1977)
Junoon (1978)

Awards
 1980: Filmfare Award for Best Supporting Actress – Junoon – Nominated
1982: Evening Standard British Film Awards – Best Actress: 36 Chowringhee Lane – Won
 1983: BAFTA Award for Best Actress in a Leading Role – 36 Chowringhee Lane – Nominated

References

External links
 Jennifer Kendal at the British Film Institute
 
 Biography from The Kapoor Family website
She didn’t really look at me: Shashi Kapoor recounts his and Jennifer Kendal’s first, and lasting, meeting in Calcutta to Deepa Gahlot – The Telegraph

1934 births
1984 deaths
People from Southport
English theatre managers and producers
Women theatre managers and producers
English film actresses
English stage actresses
British film actresses
English emigrants to India
Kapoor family
Deaths from cancer in England
Actresses in Hindi cinema
Actresses in Bengali cinema
British expatriate actresses in India
European actresses in India
Actresses of European descent in Indian films
20th-century English businesspeople
20th-century English actresses